Thout 15 - Coptic Calendar - Thout 17

The sixteenth day of the Coptic month of Thout, the first month of the Coptic year. On a common year, this day corresponds to September 13, of the Julian Calendar, and September 26, of the Gregorian Calendar. This day falls in the Coptic season of Akhet, the season of inundation.

Commemorations

Feasts 

 Coptic New Year Period

Other commemorations 
 The consecration of the Church of the Resurrection in Jerusalem
 The translocation of the body of Saint John Chrysostom to Constantinople

References 

Days of the Coptic calendar